ORP Toruń (825) is a Lublin-class minelayer-landing ship of Polish Navy, named after the city of Toruń.

Construction and career 
The flag was raised on 24 May 1991. The ship is part of the 2nd Transport and Mine Ship Squadron in Świnoujście, belonging to the 8th Coastal Defense Flotilla. The ship is intended for transporting landing troops with equipment and vehicles, setting sea mines (takes 130 minutes at a time) and evacuating people.

Gallery

References

Lublin-class minelayer-landing ships
1990 ships
Ships built in Gdańsk